Jaroslav Volf (1921-2001) was an international speedway rider from Czechoslovakia.

Speedway career 
Volf reached the final of the Speedway World Championship in the 1964 Individual Speedway World Championship.

World final appearances

Individual World Championship
 1964 –  Gothenburg, Ullevi – 15th – 3pts

World Team Cup
 1962 -  Slaný (with Luboš Tomíček Sr. / Bedřich Slaný / Karel Průša / Bohumír Bartoněk) - 4th - 16pts (3)
 1968 -  London, Wembley Stadium (with Antonín Kasper Sr. / Luboš Tomíček Sr. / Jan Holub I) - 4th' - 7pts (1)

References 

1921 births
2001 deaths
Czech speedway riders
People from Prague-East District
Sportspeople from the Central Bohemian Region